Trial by Fire is a 2018 American biographical drama film directed by Edward Zwick. The story is based upon David Grann's article "Trial by Fire" that appeared in The New Yorker in 2009. The film stars Jack O'Connell, Laura Dern, Emily Meade, Jeff Perry and Jade Pettyjohn.

Trial by Fire had its world premiere at the Telluride Film Festival on August 31, 2018 and was released on May 17, 2019, by Roadside Attractions.

Premise
On December 23, 1991, Cameron Todd Willingham awakes to find his house ablaze. Despite his best-efforts, Willingham is unable to save the lives of his three daughters.

At his trial, the prosecutor, Rick Perry, reveals the fire had been caused deliberately with gasoline spread in the shape of a pentagram and the refrigerator moved to block the door. Witnesses continue to take the stand and portray him as a violent individual. Willingham's former cellmate, Johnny Webb then takes the stand and declares Willingham told him the fire had been set deliberately. Despite impassioned pleas of Willingham's innocence by both himself and his wife Stacy, Willingham is sentenced to death.

During his time on death row, Willingham is violently beaten and threatened by both the inmates and then the guards before ultimately being placed in solitary confinement where he breaks down all while protesting his innocence and having flashbacks to his life with Stacy. During this it is revealed that Willingham and Stacy had a complicated relationship in which she cheated on him, and he acted violently towards her. Nevertheless, the two are shown to care for each other though Stacy ultimately stops replying to his letters at the behest of her mother who believes he is guilty. Willingham reaches out to a new lawyer, Reaves, in the hope of proving his innocence while adapting to his life in prison by submitting to the particularly violent guard Daniels and befriending fellow inmate, Ponchai James. During this time Willingham improves his vocabulary and writing with the help of James who is eventually taken from his cell and executed.

Willingham’s letter ultimately reaches playwright Elizabeth Gilbert who is sympathetic to his case though her ailing ex-husband and their two children both insist he is guilty. Gilbert eventually visits the prison and is taken aback by his calm demeanour with the pair connecting over their mutual struggles as parents and their love for their respective children. Willingham continues to immerse himself in art and poetry and befriends Daniels who also starts to question his innocence when he witnesses Willingham hallucinating about his daughters and reads his letters to Gilbert.

Gilbert questions the witness statements and Reaves who made no progress on the case in 6 years and then visits Webb who becomes erratic and threatens her when she questions him about Perry paying him to lie about Willingham’s confession. She further uncovers many of the witnesses had lied as Willingham’s execution date is set. Gilbert and Reaves then meet with Dr Hurst who reveals the refrigerator had not been moved and that the fire could not have been arson as the jury had said. Despite this Reaves is unable to argue an appeal and Hurst’s report is unjustly disregarded. Webb recants his testimony though this is covered up by Perry who is now a governor and had originally paid him to lie. Stacy is pressured into lying that Willingham had confessed to her.

Gilbert suffers a car crash as Willingham is taken to be executed causing her to be absent as he delivers a poignant speech showing the improvements he has made while on death row and requesting his ashes be spread over his daughter’s graves. Daniels reluctantly administers the lethal injection and tearfully watches Willingham die alongside Stacy and Reaves. Gilbert, now paralysed from her accident, spreads Willingham’s ashes with her own children present. In an epilogue the real-life Perry is seen denying any guilt over death row inmates being executed.

Cast
 Jack O'Connell as Cameron Todd Willingham
 Laura Dern as Elizabeth Gilbert
 Emily Meade as Stacy Willingham
 David Wilson Barnes as Reaves
 Jeff Perry as Hurst
 Jade Pettyjohn as Julie Gilbert
 Joshua Mikel as Screaming Inmate
 Chris Coy as Daniels
 McKinley Belcher III as Ponchai
 James Healy Jr as Arresting Officer
 Anthony Reynolds as Fogg 
 Chris Shurley as Sgt. Marty
 Petros Papadakis as 1999 Voice of the Dallas Cowboys on the Radio

Production

Development
On August 8, 2017, it was announced that Jack O'Connell and Laura Dern would star in an adaptation of the article "Trial by Fire" by American journalist David Grann with Edward Zwick directing. Zwick would produce the film together with Alex Soros, Allyn Stewart and Kipp Nelson under the Bedford Falls Company and Flashlight Films banner respectively.

Writing
Screenwriter Geoffrey S. Fletcher, who won the Academy Award for Best Adapted Screenplay for his screenplay on Precious, wrote the screenplay for the film.

Music
Henry Jackman, who worked with Zwick on Jack Reacher: Never Go Back, composed the score for the film. The soundtrack was released digitally on 17 May 2019 by Sony Classical Records.

Release
Trial by Fire had its world premiere at the Telluride Film Festival on August 31, 2018. Shortly after, Roadside Attractions acquired distribution rights to the film and scheduled it for release on May 17, 2019.

Reception

Critical response
The website's critical consensus reads, "Trial by Fire has a worthy and heartbreaking story to tell, but this well acted dramatization is undermined by its aggressive manipulative approach." On Metacritic, the film has a weighted average of score of 51 out of 100, based on 19 critics, indicating "mixed or average reviews".

References

External links
 
 

2010s English-language films
2018 biographical drama films
2010s prison films
2018 films
2018 drama films
American biographical drama films
American prison films
Roadside Attractions films
Films about arson
Films about capital punishment
Films about miscarriage of justice
Films directed by Edward Zwick
Films scored by Henry Jackman
Films set in 1991
Films set in 1992
Films set in 1999
Films set in the 2000s
Films set in 2004
Films set in Texas
Films based on newspaper and magazine articles
2010s American films